Hassan Ibrahim Samoun ( is a Syrian poet and publisher born 1956 in the countryside of Homs. Ibrahim start working in early age in the field of heavy engineering equipment and metal constructions. In 1978 he completed the educational stage in the technical college of motor mechanics, after that he studied Arabic literature at  Al-Baath University. His poetic style combines simplicity and elegance in exploring themes of love and Syrian nationalism and Arab nationalism.

Works

In the theater
The roar (life of a homeland)

In narration
Microscope  
Short Stories (Short Stories Collection)

Poetry
Signature on the grave-stone  
SAtatus of Altaswa'a  
Short Images   
Lament the light

In literature
The Syrian Open Divan

References

External links
 Blog poet Hassan Ibrahim Samoun
 Interview with  Hassan Samoun 
 Criticism of the signing of Hassan Ibrahim Semaan
 

1956 births
Al-Baath University
Syrian poets
People from Homs
Living people